Sillen is a lake in Södermanland, Sweden.  It straddles the boundary between Gnesta Municipality in Södermanland County and Södertälje Municipality in Stockholm County.

Lakes of Södermanland County
Lakes of Stockholm County